Knut Johansson (10 August 1892 – 31 October 1961) was a Finnish footballer who played for KIF Helsinki. He featured once for the Finland national football team in 1914, scoring one goal.

Career statistics

International

International goals
Scores and results list Finland's goal tally first.

References

1892 births
1961 deaths
Finnish footballers
Finland international footballers
Association football forwards